The Nachtkrapp (German, lit. "night raven") is a South German and Austrian bugbear creature, cautionary tales about which are used to scare children into going to bed. Similar legends exist in Hungary, the Czech Republic  , Poland, and Russia.

Description 
Several versions of the Nachtkrapp exist. In most legends, the Nachtkrapp is described as a giant, nocturnal raven-like bird. In Norse mythology, the Nachtkrapp (Swedish "Nattramnen", Norwegian "Nattravnen") is depicted with no eyes which if looked into cause death. It is also depicted with holes in its wings which cause illness and disease if looked at.  

Some of the most common legends claim that the Nachtkrapp leaves its hiding place at night to hunt. If it is seen by little children, it will abduct them into its nest and messily devour them, first ripping off their limbs and then picking out their heart.

According to other legends, the Nachtkrapp will merely put children in his bag and take them away.

Tales about the Wütender Nachtkrapp (German, lit. "angry night raven") are less common. Instead of abducting children, it simply crows loudly and flutters its wings, until the children have been terrorized into silence.

The Guter Nachtkrapp (German, lit. "good night raven") is a rare benevolent version of the Nachtkrapp tale. In Burgenland myths, this bird enters the children's room and gently sings them to sleep.

Background 
The origins of the Nachtkrapp legends are still unknown, but a connection possibly exists to rook infestations in Central Europe. Already feared due to their black feathers and scavenging diet, the mass gatherings quickly became an existential threat to farmers and gave rooks and crows their place in folklore as all-devouring monsters.

However, according to Deutsches Wörterbuch, the term Nachtrabe (German, lit. "night raven") was used to describe nocturnal birds such as owls or the night heron.

In Popular Culture 
In the mobile game Year Walk, one of the Watchers is a Night Raven that steals a key.   

In the subsequent Year Walk: Bedtime Stories for Awful Children, the fourth chapter is devoted to the Night Raven.

References 

German legendary creatures
Czech folklore
Hungarian legendary creatures
Polish folklore
Russian folklore
Legendary crows
Slavic legendary creatures